The Madrid–León high-speed rail line (Spanish language: Línea de Alta Velocidad Madrid - León) was inaugurated on 29 September 2015. The line is built to standard gauge and gauge changers are provided at strategic points to allow interchange with older Spanish railways which were built to Iberian gauge.

History 
The line was inaugurated in two stages. Its first  section Madrid - Segovia - Valladolid opened for commercial service on 23 December 2007 and is the first instalment of a high-speed rail corridor in the north and northwest of Spain. The second  section Valladolid-Venta de Baños-León opened on 29 September 2015 and was built at a cost of €1,62bn for operation at up to 350 km/h. Since then the journey time between Madrid and León was cut by 44 min to 2 h 6 min on AVE trains.

Plan for 2015-2020 
According to this, the line will be extended to reach the region of Asturias and will connect the cities of Oviedo and Gijón to the high-speed network via the Pajares Base Tunnel (Variante de Pajares).

The line will be connected with the following other HSR (High-speed rail) lines:
 Madrid–Galicia high-speed rail line, and this in turn with the Atlantic Axis high-speed rail line 
 HSR Valladolid - Burgos - Vitoria, and this in turn to the future HSR Logroño-Miranda de Ebro and the HSR Basque Y. 
 Other high-speed lines departing from Madrid, with the future construction of a third tunnel with standard gauge tracks between Chamartin and Atocha stations.

Features
In the section between Valladolid and León the route comprises  of double track and two single-track sections totalling . Gauge changers are installed at Chamartin Valdestillas, Valladolid, León and Villamuriel south of Palencia and this has reduced travel times on all routes between Madrid and Spain's north-northwest.

Route

(The figures indicate kilometres from Madrid)

 Gauge changer
 345.450 León AV (166,141 km from Valladolid Campo Grande)
 344.277 Junction Estadio Municipal
 343.879 Classification changer 
 339.527 Vilecha changer
 338.245 Junction Vilecha
 320.332 PCA Luengos
 297.591 Junction Las Arenas
 276.537 Villada AV maintenance center 
 259.999 Junction Las Barreras
 244.212 PCA Becerril
 231.315 Level crossing Los Tres Pasos
 230.627 Palencia
 224.754 Villamuriel changer
 223.530 Junction Cerrato AV
 222.699 Desvío 10 of the Junction Cerrato
 217.578 Junction Venta de Baños AV
 208.447 Crossover Dueñas AV
 198.097 PCA Valoria
 187.360 Junction Las Pajareras 
 186.283 Junction Canal del Duero
 181.241 Level crossing La Pilarica 
 179.6 Valladolid-Campo Grande 
 173.1 Level crossing  (Pinar de Antequera) 
 168.0 Rio Duero
 conventional line Madrid-Irun (Gauge changer) 
 159.6 Valdestillas / Transition double track to single track 
 144.0 Conventional Line Madrid-Irun 
 Future link L.A.V. Olmedo-Zamora-Galicia (in draft) 
 Link L.A.V. Olmedo-Zamora-Galicia 
 Intersection with N-601 
 133.0 Olmedo 
 106.6 Nava de la Asunción 
 97.1 to 94.4 Tabladillo Tunnel 
 86.0 Garcillán 
 72.5 to 70.7 Puentecilla Tunnel 
 Conventional Line Intersection with Villa 
 68.3 Segovia Guiomar 
 66.2 to 37.5 Guadarrama Tunnels 
 35.5 Soto del Real 
 Junction with conventional line Madrid-Burgos 
 32.9 Arroyo Valley Viaduct 
 32.1 to 23.2 tunnels of Cerro de San Pedro 
 Junction with conventional line Madrid-Burgos 
 18.9 Trivialization Post Tres Cantos 
 Junction with conventional line Madrid-Burgos 
 Line Conv. Madrid-Alcobendas/S.S. de los Reyes 
 Fuencarral maintenance center 
 Intersection with link-Hortaleza Pitis 
 Intersection with link-Hortaleza Chamartin 
 Link to Chamartin Iberian gauge (width changer) 
 Madrid-Chamartin 0.50 
 End of Line (future AV tunnel-Chamartin Atocha)

Key facts
 Inauguration: 22 December 2007 for the section Madrid–Valladolid (entry into service the next day). 29 September 2015 for the section Valladolid–León.
 Approximate cost: 4,205 million euro for the section Madrid–Valladolid (about 700 M € are for the reform of the RAF of Valladolid). 1,620 million euro for the section Valladolid–León.
 Tender: commissioned by the Government to GIF (today ADIF) in 1998. 
 Intermediate stations: Segovia Guiomar (kilometre post 68.3), Valladolid, Venta de Baños. 
 At kilometre post 133.8 there is a junction for the 2021-completed Madrid–Galicia high-speed rail line, negotiable at up to 220 km/h.

Technical details
 Length 179.6 km Madrid–Valladolid + 162.7 km Valladolid–León
 Total length in tunnels 42,1 km  
 Total length on viaducts 2 km 
 UIC gauge 
 Electrification 25 kV 50 Hz AC 
 Maximum speed 350 km/h 
 Digital Signage ASFA and ERTMS II 
 Platform width 16 m 
 PAET 3 (Soto del Real, Garcillán and Olmedo) 
 PB 3 (Tres Cantos, Nava, Valdestillas) 
 Gauge Changers 3 (Madrid Chamartin, Valdestillas, Valladolid)

PB = Puesto de Banalización (transition from double to single track?)
PAET = Puesto de Adelantamiento y Estacionamiento de Trenes (passing loop?)

Special projects

 Guadarrama Tunnel (28,377 m) 
 Tunnels of San Pedro (8,930 m) 
 Arroyo Valley Viaduct (1,796 m, maximum height 77.8 m) 
 Tabladillo tunnel (2 km) 
 Puentecilla Tunnel (1900 m) 
 Tunel del Pinar de Antequera (1 km) (opening 8 November 2009)

Reduced travel times
Talgo trains were replaced by Alvia trains (RENFE Class 130) and these operate on both the high-speed line and the older lines.

These trains pass through the gauge changers at Valladolid and Valdestillas or to join the General Line North from this high speed line and back by reducing their travel time by reducing the distance and increasing the commercial speed in the stretch Madrid–Valladolid.

The Talgo Madrid-Galicia was diverted later by LAV circulating until Valdestillas changer, which reverses the direction of travel and change of locomotive. In this case the time reduction has been lower, only 15-20 min, while in the Galicia-Madrid train has been an advantage to using the best line to be able to recover the backlog.

Services that use these lines

AVE Chamartin Madrid–Segovia–Valladolid, Campo Grande–Palencia–Léon at 2:13 S-102
AVE Chamartin Madrid–Valladolid, Campo Grande–Palencia–Léon at 2:06 S-102
Avant-Chamartin Madrid-Segovia Guiomar 0:35 nonstop S121 
Avant Valladolid to Madrid Chamartin station at 1:10 Segovia Guiomar S121 
Alvia Madrid-Chamartin Hendaye Segovia Guiomar 
Valladolid-Campo Grande 
Burgos 
Miranda de Ebro 
Vitoria-Gasteiz 
Alsasua 
San Sebastian 
Irun S130 gauge change in Valladolid / Valdestillas 
Alvia Bilbao-Madrid-Chamartin Abando Segovia Guiomar 
Valladolid-Campo Grande 
Burgos S130 gauge change in Valladolid / Valdestillas 
Alvia Madrid-Chamartin Santander Segovia Guiomar 
Valladolid-Campo Grande 
Palencia 
Aguilar de Campóo 
Reinosa 
Torrelavega S130 gauge change in Valladolid / Valdestillas 
1 train per day each direction continues its journey to Alicante 
Alvia Madrid-Chamartin Gijón-suburban Segovia Guiomar 
Valladolid-Campo Grande 
Palencia 
Sahagun 
Léon 
Mieres-Puente 
Oviedo 
Jovellanos Gijón S130-wide change in Valladolid / Valdestillas 
1 train per day each direction continues its journey to Alicante 
Talgo Madrid-Chamartin La Coruna Segovia Guiomar 
Medina del Campo 
Zamora 
Puebla de Sanabria 
The Gudiña 
Orense-Joint 
Carballiño 
Santiago de Compostela Talgo VI gauge change in Valdestillas 
Talgo Madrid-Chamartin Pontevedra (*) 
Guillarei 
Redondela 
Vigo Talgo VI (*) circulates together with the branch of La Coruna to Orense 
gauge change in Valdestillas

Speed
The maximum permissible speed in line with ERTMS II in service are shown below.

See also
 List of highest railways in Europe

References

 Article in Ferropedia 
 Construction of the LAV dossier SkyscraperCity 
 Construction of the LAV-2 dossier SkyscraperCity 
 Construction of the LAV, thread 1 tranvia.org 
 Construction of the LAV, thread 2 tranvia.org

Transport in Castile and León
Rail transport in Madrid
High-speed railway lines in Spain
Standard gauge railways in Spain
Railway lines opened in 2007